The Lazaga class  is a series of midsize patrol vessels for coastal and exclusive economic zone patrol, built by the Spanish National Bazán shipyards (now Navantia) for the Spanish Navy and the Royal Moroccan Navy. Two of the Spanish units were later transferred to the Colombian Navy.

A second batch of four units was built in 1980–1982 for the Royal Moroccan Navy, which were slightly different from the initial units in armament and navigational systems, as they included missile capability (Exocet MM-40), although that was later removed.

Service

Spain
Their early retirement from the Spanish Navy prompted an inquiry in the Spanish senate about the reasons for their decommissioning; some of the reasons presented included lack of endurance and lack of a helicopter capability. It seems, however, that the navy was using the ships for roles more complex than those initially designed for. Under its initial German design, the ships were designed for fast attack by the German Navy as fast attack ships using Exocet missiles in the Baltic Sea, allowing for quick return to their bases. Budgetary restrictions did not allow that plan to be fully completed and they were not fitted with missile capability in the end, which left them stripped of one of their most important capabilities.

The creation of the Maritime service of the Civil Guard only sped up their demise in the Spanish Navy, since many small and midsize boats were decommissioned from the navy as some of the coast guard functions were transferred to the new service.

Some of their systems, including the Oto Melara 76 mm/62 cannon, the diesel engines and the surface search radar were dismounted and used as spare parts for the Descubierta-class corvettes which shared those systems.

Morocco
Some of the systems, including the 76 mm/62 Oto Melara cannons, their targeting systems were ceded to the Royal Moroccan Navy. In 2008, two of the Moroccan vessels were upgraded in Cartagena, Spain, for an estimated amount of  10 million

Colombia
Two of these boats were transferred to the Colombian Navy in 1997, where they served until 2009 when they were finally disposed of and sunk as part of the "Pelícano II" training exercises.

Ships of the class

References

Bibliography
 

Patrol vessels of Colombia
Patrol vessels of the Spanish Navy
Patrol vessels of Morocco